A magnitude 5.8 earthquake struck the Democratic Republic of the Congo  north northeast of Kabare, South Kivu on August 7 at a depth of .

Impact
One policeman was killed by a falling wall in Bukavu, and two children were killed by a house fire caused by the quake. Several houses collapsed and people were also injured in neighboring Rwanda.

See also
List of earthquakes in 2015
List of earthquakes in the Democratic Republic of Congo

References

External links

South Kivu
South Kivu earthquake
South Kivu 2015
South Kivu earthquake
Earthquake 2015